The Shay is a sports stadium in Halifax, West Yorkshire, England. 

The stadium is owned by Calderdale Metropolitan Borough Council and leased by the Shay Stadium Trust, a not-for-profit company set up to preserve the ground as a sports stadium.

The Shay lies on the south side of Halifax, about a quarter of a mile from the town centre. The four stands at the stadium include the North Stand, the East Stand, the South Stand and the Skircoat Stand. The North and South stands were built in the mid-1990s. The Skircoat Stand is the oldest stand in the stadium.

Etymology
'Shay' is derived from the old English word 'shaw', which means a small wood, thicket or grove. 
The two words are used interchangeably in ancient references to the property upon which the stadium was eventually constructed.

History

Earliest sources
Such references to the name Shay have been traced as far back as 1462, when on 6 July of that year a wealthy local man named William Brodley recorded that upon his death, property belonging to him just west of Shaghe Lane should pass to his son, John Brodley. 
At the time of the third year of Henry VIII's reign (this means either 1511 or 1512), the Subsidy Roll (effectively the equivalent of our present income tax) had recorded William Brodley junior as being assessed on goods to the value of £20, and by 1545 the property was still in his possession. 
This may seem a small sum today but it is worth noting that only five people locally were assessed at £20 (including the wealthy Vicar Haldesworth who was once robbed of £1,000), so it is fair to say that William Brodley was a man of influence and money. 
Indeed, at this time, only one man was assessed at more than £20, and he was the wealthy merchant John Hardy who paid 44 shillings (£2.20) tax on goods assessed at £66. 
What this goes to prove is that the Shay Estate was one of the finest areas of 16th century Halifax. 
Just when William Brodley died is not clear but we do know that the Shay descended to his daughter and heiress Grace Hely in 1580, and in turn to her husband John Booth in 1587. This was recorded in the Halifax Court Rolls as Booth becoming the owner of 'Shaw and Nether Shaw'. 
At about this time, conservation of water and the maintenance of its purity were matters of extreme importance, and in 1588 John Booth arranged for a small dam to be constructed within the Shay Estate so as to provide enough water for his needs. This supply was later diverted away from the Shaw Syke in 1602 and within two years Booth surrendered ownership of 'Over and Nether Shaw' to the use of Simon Bynnes of Broadbottom. 
As there are no records of subsequent owners after Bynnes, or of the houses they would have lived in, this gives us the opportunity to jump forward to the 18th century to introduce the name of perhaps the Shay's most noted owner – John Caygill.

John Caygil
John Caygill was a very important person among the people of Halifax. Certainly, John Caygill contributed to Halifax's lasting heritage – as well as building the Shay mansion, he contributed to the erection of two other landmarks in the town. The first of these was the building of houses on a piece of land known as the Square, of which construction was finished around 1758. Designed by John Carr of York, they were grand buildings and some even became offices. In 1923 the Halifax Corporation purchased the land and the buildings were demolished in 1959.

John Caygill's second big achievement was in providing the land and a sum of £840 for the construction of the Piece Hall – a monument which still stands today as a tourist attraction.

Ibbetson Family
John Caygill junior's only child, the aforementioned 'Jenny', became sole heiress to her father's estates, including the Shay. She would marry Sir James Ibbetson, Baronet of Leeds and Denton on 8 February 1768, and thus the ownership of the Shay Estate passed into the Ibbetson family. It is clear that the Ibbetson family did not live at the Shay - they did not need to, and so in the Halifax Journal of 18 April 1807, the mansion built by John Caygill was advertised for letting. The same advertisement in the Halifax Journal also gave details of the mansion itself. There was a landing  and a spacious gallery on the second floor, while the drawing room and the five 'lodging rooms' with dressing rooms adjoining, were on the same scale as the rooms below. The doors were of solid mahogany and it was evidently well fitted for its purposes.

The addresses given to all the houses on the Shay Estate in the census returns. The Shay mansion's address is down as 'The Shay, Caygill's Walk' in two reports whilst addresses for the other houses are termed variably as the Shay, Shay Stable Yard, Shay Yard, Caygill's Walk and Shay Farm, though there is no doubt that they all refer to the same appropriate buildings, and are not new or separate ones. From the 1840s until 1903, there were six owners of the Shay Estate. William Boocock was the Shay mansion's last owner, though he only lived there for a few years up to 1903. By this time the Shay Estate was in the hands of the Halifax Corporation, and with the completion of the new Skircoat Road, the future of the Shay must have looked very much in doubt.

Redevelopment of the Shay Estate
Up until 1890 any traffic heading in the direction of Huddersfield travelled along the main route which ran from the town centre along the bottom of the Shay, up Shaw Hill to Huddersfield Road. It was the idea of John Booth to develop the pleasant Caygill's Walk, which ran along the top of the Shay, into what is now the busy Skircoat Road. At the time his scheme came under heavy criticism from local people. This dramatic period in the Shay's history continued when, two years later, on 29 August 1891, Skircoat Road was opened for traffic for the first time. In 1903, with the Shay mansion no longer being used for residential purposes, the Corporation saw fit to demolish it.

From the time of the demolition of the mansion, what was left of the Shay Estate became the object of many schemes. On 9 November 1898, it was announced that a proposal had been put forward to run goods trains to the Shay Estate and build a goods depot there. On 31 May 1902 an agreement was made by the Midland Rail Company for the purchase of the estate, the company having sought powers to construct a loop line at Low Moor railway station and to run a part of the Lancashire and Yorkshire line to Halifax. However, shortly after this, "owing to the present position of railways and the condition of the money market", there was no reasonable prospect of the proposed railway being constructed in the immediate future, and all plans were abandoned.

Work had actually been started on a tunnel to run under the newly constructed Skircoat Road, on the Well Head side of the road, and this tunnel is still in evidence today, though many people are unaware of its existence. The only purpose for which it was intended for use after this was as one of many air raid shelters in Halifax during the Second World War. Between 1908 and 1910 it was proposed to build a slaughterhouse on the Shay.

During the First World War the Shay was used by the local Territorial Army to practice trench digging. About 1920, rumours started to circulate that the Shay could be transformed into a football ground. Even then, there was some criticism of the idea, but the board of Halifax Town made an official approach to the Shay's owners, the Corporation, and it was accepted.

Football ground
At a public meeting on 9 July 1920, the then Halifax Town chairman Dr A.H. Muir stated: "Speaking from inside information I know that if, in February 1921, we can produce a ground that will meet league requirements, and if we can show financial backing that is worthy of a town this size, our position as members of the English League with all that means, is absolutely secure."

In that same speech Dr. Muir announced that the Town directors were to meet members of the Corporation's Improvements Committee with a view to the leasing of the Shay, so that they could prepare it in time for the 1921-22 season. Halifax Town, formed in 1911, had earlier played at Sandhall Lane and then Exley – a totally unsuitable venue. On Wednesday 4 August 1920, a recommendation was put to the committee which was passed and the Halifax Courier set up a fund to help get the Shay ready. Timber was delivered to the Shay for work to begin on Saturday 16 October 1920.

An appeal was made in the Halifax Courier that night for people to help on the following Monday. Fans, players and directors worked together to get the ground ready, and on 7 December the first grass sods were laid on the playing pitch. It was a successful venture.

In March 1921, Halifax Town were elected to the Football League, and along with clubs such as Accrington Stanley, Ashington, Durham City and Nelson, became founder members of the newly formed Division Three North. So the people of Halifax waited eagerly for League soccer. It arrived at the Shay on 3 September 1921 when Halifax Town, in front of 10,000 spectators, rose to the occasion and defeated a Darlington side 5–0 (avenging a 2–0 defeat by the same club the previous Saturday). And thus the Shaymen were born.

Whilst the club never reached the upper tiers of the football pyramid, the Shay has been the scene of some historic matches, not least its very first Football League game on 3 September 1921. It is history now, of course, that Town defeated Darlington 5–0 in front of a crowd of over 10,000, although as Town slipped towards the bottom of the table during the course of the season, attendances fell also.

The record attendance for the Shay was 36,885 on 14 February 1953 in the 5th round of the FA Cup against Tottenham Hotspur. It is fair to say with confidence that the 36,885 figure that watched the Spurs game will never be bettered. Though the Shay could once hold 40,000, safety measures dictate that it never will again. In fact, the capacity put on the Shay has reduced dramatically since the early 1970s: in 1970 it was 38,000, 1972 it was 25,000, 1977 it was 23,000, 1979 it was 16,500.

The capacity stood at 16,500 until 1985 at which time the Popplewell Report into ground safety was released following the Valley Parade disaster in May of that year. All standing areas at the Shay were closed, and for a time, while it remained seating only, the new capacity was set at 1,777. Safety work was subsequently carried out and the capacity raised to 3,600. When Halifax Town were paired up with Nottingham Forest in the FA Cup in January 1988, in an effort to keep the tie at the Shay, more work was carried out and the capacity was raised further to 4,021. An almost full house attended that Forest game – 4,012.  When the council took over the Shay in 1987 it became part of Calderdale Leisure Services (CLS) and in July 1988 new plans were announced for the ground. A new stand was purchased from Scunthorpe United and other major ground improvements were being made.

Financial troubles
On 27 October 1986, then chairman John Madeley announced that the club was close to collapse. 
Many people looked to Calderdale Council to help save the club as it still owned the lease on the ground and any plans for the Shay from private companies would have to be given the council's go-ahead. However, on 17 November it rejected two plans to save the club. One proposal was from a London property firm wanting to build shops on the Shay. The other, involving the development of a sports complex, including a ground for the club, was turned down because of difficulties over the conditions demanded by the Edinburgh property firm behind the move. These 'difficulties' concerned the lease of the Shay. With the council unwilling to part with the lease, it came as no surprise when the Edinburgh firm pulled out of its bid to save the club. On 26 November, the Inland Revenue gave Halifax Town just six days to come up with proposals for paying the £76,000 tax debt.

The situation became so serious that Halifax Town manager Mick Jones resigned for a more secure position at Peterborough United. On 23 December, John Madeley announced he had signed an agreement with a property company which, he said, would safeguard soccer at the Shay until the end of the season. They were prepared to put money into the club, but wanted to move it out of the Shay so they could develop it after the season's close.

In February 1987 it came to light that this property company was a local firm, Marshall Construction of Elland. They wanted to build a superstore for Gateway Foodmarkets on the Shay. On 4 March 1987, councillor Geoffrey Butler put forward a plan to split the Shay – one half as a soccer ground with the other to be developed. The scheme seemed exciting but like the plans of Marshall's and others, it was rejected by the council. Marshall's offered to build Halifax Town a 4,500 capacity stadium next to the nearby North Bridge Leisure Centre, though they still wanted to build a superstore on the Shay. On 18 March, the new plan was also rejected. Though many people in Halifax were not too bothered about the club's plight, soccer fans cried out to the council to make a positive move.

2008 and new developments
Although Halifax Town went into liquidation in the summer of 2008, newly formed FC Halifax Town replaced them, albeit at three levels below Halifax Town's position when they dissolved. These days the Shay has quickly changed beyond recognition. The two new blocks of terracing at the north and south ends of the pitch have brought the once run-down stadium up to date. The Skircoat Stand has been turned into an all-seated and the East Stand takes the stadium's capacity above 10,000 for the first time since the 1980s. The Shay is no longer just a football ground and is now home to not only FC Halifax Town, but also the town's rugby league club, Halifax. They moved to the Shay in 1998 after their historic home at Thrum Hall had, like the Shay, fallen into a state of disrepair. Redevelopment has come at a cost, the majority of which has been provided through grants.

Uses

Speedway
Before the Shay, the Halifax Dukes used a track at Thrum Hall, and on 8 February 1949 construction began on a new Motorcycle speedway track at the Shay.
This meant that the football pitch had to be reduced in size and each goalpost was moved three yards into the playing area so an agreement was reached by the speedway and soccer clubs whereby the Halifax Dukes had to pay the Halifax Town AFC 10% of all speedway gate receipts.

The first speedway meeting was held on Wednesday 6 April 1949, and the opponents were Yarmouth Bloaters. The track was officially opened by Major R.E. Austin, commanding officer of the Duke of Wellington's Regiment at Halifax. 
Speedway at the Shay was not popular and poor attendances saw the club struggling financially. On 10 November 1951 speedway promoter Bruce Booth brought midget car racing to the Shay to boost funds. 15,000 spectators attended this one-off venture – 3 times higher that the average speedway gate. 
On 31 March 1952, Booth announced the end of speedway 'while rates and taxation remains at the present levels'.

In November 1962 Middlesbrough speedway promoter Reg Fearman saw the Shay for the first time, and in 1963 he made a formal application to Halifax Town for use of the ground to revive the sport. At the beginning of 1965 work began on constructing the ground and speedway returned. The second time around it proved successful, and remained at the ground for the next twenty years. By the 1970s people valued it greater than football for family entertainment, with the Dukes producing such renowned riders as Eric Boocock and Kenny Carter. Attendances became regularly higher than those of the football club and the Shay often hosted speedway internationals.

In 1986, after disputes over money with Halifax Town AFC, the speedway club moved out of town to neighbouring Bradford and the Odsal Stadium, becoming known as the Bradford Dukes.

Rugby League
In 1998 rugby league club Halifax sold their historic home ground Thrum Hall, which had been their home since 1886 for £1.5 million to the retail chain Asda and moved their base to the Shay.

There have been many top players for Halifax over the years, including internationals, tourists and overseas stars. The leading 36 of these are featured in a "Hall of Fame" in the Weavers Bar at the Shay Stadium.

During 2011 as a result of pitch renovation work at the Kirklees Stadium in Huddersfield, Huddersfield RLFC played three home fixtures of Super League XVI at the Shay.

2013 Rugby League World Cup

The Shay played host to a Group C game as part of the 2013 World Cup between Tonga and Italy.

Structure

North Stand

The North Stand was completed first (before the South Stand), which enabled Halifax Town to return to the Football League when it won the Conference in 1998. The South Stand was completed within the next year. The stand is usually where away fans are housed. In recent times the stand hasn't been used as Halifax Town's opponents don't tend to bring a large following of supporters. For rugby league the stand is usually open. It is a terraced stand.

South Stand

The South Stand is generally where the home fans stand. It was once the away stand.  The stand has a bar in its concourse and catering facilities are situated outside.

East Stand

The East Stand is now the main stand at the Shay. 
In the past it has been the main problem at the Shay as when the Family Stand was demolished in 2000, construction on the new East Stand started but stopped when Halifax Town were relegated in 2002.
The stand remained in this state until late 2008 when Calderdale Council agreed to put money into completing the stand. The stand was redesigned by Sheffield-based architects Ward McHugh Associates prior to the commencement of works. 
Main structural work on the stand was completed in December 2009, it then needed to go through safety checks and to be furnished inside. 
28 March 2010; the new East Stand opened taking the overall ground capacity to over 10,000, as well as providing six executive boxes overlooking the pitch, which can accommodate up to 12 people per box and also new facilities as listed below.

Skircoat West Stand

The stand used to be half-seating half-standing but became all-seater in 1998. It is the oldest part of the ground and is not the full length of the pitch. Like the North Stand it was built on the side of a slope and backs onto the main road.

Facilities
The East Stand will house new shops for the local football and rugby teams, as well as new home and away changing rooms, a physio room and new food and beverage kiosks for fans.
The brand new East Stand, conference facilities and car park at Halifax's Shay Stadium place the venue back at the heart of Calderdale's sporting and community life.
There are 11 function rooms, ranging in size to accommodate every type of event, from one-to-one interviews to larger conferences, weddings and meetings for up to 350 guests.

There is also a 5-a-side pitch next to the southern turnstiles that can be hired.

Community usage

In June 2007, Shay Stadium Community Football was formed. The community scheme was set up as a non for profit organisation using the stadium as a main hub. The leader of the project was Lee Ashforth who drove the company forwards and set up a committee based on 4 directors who previously had been involved with the Shay Stadium Trust. The company started by delivering sessions aimed at primary school children and delivering holiday courses throughout every school holiday.

Since the company then grew and included nurseries and adult sessions aimed at fitness and socialising. The community scheme also delivers a BTEC education course at 16–18 years of age.

The future
Although no plans for future redevelopment have been confirmed, there has been talk of a new west stand, replacing the current Skircoat Stand. The plan was to build a two-tier stand with shops that backed onto Skircoat Road, however nothing has been officially announced.

Within the original East Stand designs there were plans for hospitality and media facilities in the south-east corner of the stadium. This stand (which is adjoined to the East Stand and of the same height) has been in a partially constructed state since work halted on the East Stand in 2002. This corner was omitted from the 2008 redesign and subsequent completion of the East Stand. Although there are no finances in place nor the demand to finish this corner, if there is ever the need many would imagine that this corner would be completed first as there would be less planning/construction issues, and would thus be a quick way of increasing capacity/facilities. Some might argue that the unfinished stand detracts from the overall look of the ground.

References

External links

The Shay Stadium official website
Aerial view of The Shay
The Shay Stadium on the Football Ground Guide

Football venues in England
Rugby league stadiums in England
Rugby League World Cup stadiums
Defunct speedway venues in England
Halifax R.L.F.C.
Halifax Town A.F.C.
FC Halifax Town
Buildings and structures in Halifax, West Yorkshire
Sports venues in West Yorkshire
Sports venues completed in 1921
English Football League venues
Sport in Halifax, West Yorkshire